The Department of Texas was a military department of the United States Army that existed from 1850 to 1861, and again from 1865 to 1866, from 1870 to 1913 and during the First World War.  It was subordinate to the Military Division of the Missouri.

Commanders

First creation
 Brevet Major General Persifor Frazer Smith, 1850 to 1856
 Colonel Albert Sidney Johnston, April 1, 1856, to May 18, 1857
 Brevet Major General David E. Twiggs, May 18, 1857, to February 19, 1861
 Lt. Colonel Washington Seawell, December 10, 1859, to February 6, 1860. (temporary or acting)
 Colonel Robert E. Lee, February 6, 1860, to December 12, 1860. (temporary or acting)
 Colonel Carlos A. Waite, February 19, 1861. to April 23, 1861, when the officers of the U.S. Army's Department of Texas are all taken as prisoners of war at the department's headquarters in San Antonio, Texas.
Second creation
 Bvt. Major General Gordon Granger, June 19, 1865, to August 2, 1865
 Bvt. Major General Horatio G. Wright, July 20, 1865, to August 18, 1866
Third creation
 Colonel Joseph J. Reynolds, April 16, 1870, to January 29, 1872
 Brigadier General Christopher C. Augur, November 1871 to March 1875
 Brigadier General Edward Ord, April 11, 1875, to December 6, 1880
 Colonel David S. Stanley, December 7, 1880, to January 3, 1881
 Brigadier General Christopher Columbus Augur, January 2, 1881, to October 31, 1883
 Brigadier General Ranald S. Mackenzie, November 1 to December 19, 1883
 Brigadier General David S. Stanley, May 8, 1884 to June 1, 1892
 Brigadier General Zenas Bliss, April 25, 1895? to May 22, 1897
 Brigadier General Frederick Dent Grant, October 1902 to January 15, 1904
Fourth creation
 Brigadier General James Parker, May to August 1917

References
 

Texas
1850 establishments in Texas